Vanaja may mean:
 Vanaja (film), a 2006 Indian film by Rajnesh Domalpalli
 Vanaja (Finland), a former Finnish municipality and Iron Age archaeological excavation
 Vanajavesi, a lake in Finland
 Vanajan Autotehdas, a defunct producer of Vanaja heavy vehicles in Hämeenlinna, Finland